The 5th annual Berlin International Film Festival was held from 24 June to 5 July 1955. This year's festival did not give any official jury prizes, instead awards were given by audience voting. This continued until the FIAPF granted Berlin "A-Status" in 1956. The Golden Bear was awarded to Die Ratten by audience vote.

Films in competition
The following films were in competition for the Golden Bear award:

Key
{| class="wikitable" width="550" colspan="1"
| style="background:#FFDEAD;" align="center"| †
|Winner of the main award for best film in its section
|}

Awards
The following prizes were awarded by audience votes:
 Golden Bear: Die Ratten by Robert Siodmak
 Silver Bear: Marcelino pan y Vino by Ladislao Vajda
 Bronze Berlin Bear: Carmen Jones by Otto Preminger
 Big Gold Medal (Documentaries and Culture Films): The Vanishing Prairie by James Algar
 Big Silver Medal (Documentaries and Culture Films): Continente perduto by Enrico Gras, Giorgio Moser
 Big Bronze Medal (Documentaries and Culture Films): Im Schatten des Karakorum by Eugen Schuhmacher
 Small Gold Medal (Short Film): Zimmerleute des Waldes by Heinz Sielmann
 Small Silver Medal (Short Film): Siam by Ralph Wright
 Small Bronze Medal (Short Film): Pantomimes by Paul Paviot

References

External links
 5th Berlin International Film Festival 1955
 1955 Berlin International Film Festival
 Berlin International Film Festival:1955 at Internet Movie Database

05
1955 film festivals
1955 in West Germany
1950s in Berlin